The following lists events that happened during 1962 in the Republic of the Congo (Léopoldville).

Incumbent
 President: Joseph Kasa-Vubu
 Prime Minister: Cyrille Adoula

Events

See also

 Republic of the Congo (Léopoldville)
 History of the Democratic Republic of the Congo
 Congo Crisis

References

Sources

 
Years of the 20th century in the Democratic Republic of the Congo
Democratic Republic of the Congo
Democratic Republic of the Congo